Hedonist is the second studio album by French DJ and producer Martin Solveig, released on 2 June 2005.

Track listing
Adapted from iTunes. All songs written, composed and produced by Martin Solveig

Charts

References

2005 albums
Martin Solveig albums